Rocca Canterano is a  (municipality) in the Metropolitan City of Rome in the Italian region of Latium, located about  east of Rome.

Rocca Canterano borders the following municipalities: Agosta, Anticoli Corrado, Canterano, Cerreto Laziale, Gerano, Marano Equo, Saracinesco.

People
Florestano Di Fausto, architect, engineer and politician

References

Cities and towns in Lazio